Boyz II Men (pronounced boys to men), also known as B2M, is an American vocal harmony group from Philadelphia, Pennsylvania, best known for emotional ballads and a cappella harmonies. They are currently a trio composed of baritone Nathan Morris alongside tenors Wanyá Morris and Shawn Stockman. During the 1990s, Boyz II Men were a quartet, including bass singer Michael McCary, who left the group in 2003 due to health issues which were eventually diagnosed as multiple sclerosis.

The group gained international success in 1991, beginning with the release of top 5 singles "Motownphilly" and "It's So Hard to Say Goodbye to Yesterday." Their number one single "End of the Road" was released in 1992, and topped music charts across the globe. "End of the Road" set a new record for longevity, holding the number one spot on Billboard Hot 100 for thirteen weeks. Boyz II Men broke this record with the subsequent releases of "I'll Make Love to You" and "One Sweet Day" (with Mariah Carey), which, at fourteen and sixteen weeks, respectively, each set new records for the total number of weeks at number one. "I'll Make Love to You" topped the charts in Australia for four weeks and garnered international success.

Consequently, Boyz II Men is among the music industry's elite with regard to time spent at number one in Billboard history - with 50 cumulative weeks. They rank sixth behind Drake, the Beatles, Rihanna, Elvis Presley and Carey. Furthermore, when "On Bended Knee" took the number one spot away from "I'll Make Love to You", Boyz II Men became only the third artists ever (after the Beatles and Presley) to replace themselves at the top of the Billboard Hot 100. These achievements were enough to earn Boyz II Men recognition as Billboard magazine's biggest boy band during the period of 1987 to 2012. Boyz II Men has received four Grammy Awards.

Boyz II Men continue to perform worldwide, as a trio. Their most recent studio album, Under the Streetlight, was released in 2017.

In June 2017, a section of Broad Street (from Christian to Carpenter Streets) in Philadelphia was renamed "Boyz II Men Boulevard". This section of the street is near the Philadelphia High School for the Creative and Performing Arts, where the members once attended.

History

1985–1990: Group formation and beginnings 

The group, originally named Unique Attraction, was formed in 1985 by Michael Grimaldi, Nathan Morris, and Marc Nelson at the Philadelphia High School for the Creative and Performing Arts (CAPA) along with fellow schoolmates George Baldi, Jon Shoats, and Marguerite Walker. In 1987, Wanyá Morris, who sang in the school's choir along with the members of Unique Attraction, joined the group and became a permanent member as a freshman. In 1988, Baldi, Shoats and Walker all left the group due to graduation. They then recruited Shawn Stockman after seeing him perform a solo in the school's choir. After an encounter in a school bathroom, Michael McCary started singing along with the group and eventually became the group's new bass singer. With a permanent lineup of members, the group rehearsed in the high school's bathrooms, on the corners of their schools, and in other local areas. At CAPA, they were mentored by LaDeva Davis.

Finding inspiration in New Edition's harmonies and routines, they eventually renamed the group "Boyz II Men", after New Edition's "Boys to Men", from the 1988 album Heart Break. After performing at a Valentine's Day party at school in 1989, they snuck into a concert put on by local radio station Power 99 at the Philadelphia Civic Center. Their plan was to find Will Smith backstage and perform for him. However, while looking for Smith, they happened to cross paths with New Edition member Michael Bivins, who along with fellow band mates Ricky Bell and Ronnie DeVoe, just announced they were forming a New Edition spin-off trio Bell Biv DeVoe. After they sang New Edition's "Can You Stand the Rain" for him, Bivins and everyone in attendance, including other celebrities, were impressed. He then gave the group his number and told them to give him a call. Nate eventually called him, and he agreed to manage and helped produce the group.

The delay before recording their own material and reported personality conflicts led founding member Marc Nelson to leave the group, making Boyz II Men into the quartet that found international fame: Michael McCary, Nathan Morris, Wanyá Morris and Shawn Stockman.

1991–1993: Cooleyhighharmony and "End of the Road" 
Boyz II Men's first album, Cooleyhighharmony, was released on Motown in 1991 and was produced by Michael Bivins. Cooleyhighharmonys drum-heavy new jack swing sound and multi-layered sampled backdrops were similar to that of Bell Biv DeVoe's own work, but featured classic-soul styled vocals in place of BBD's rapping and brassier singing. This style was dubbed "hip hop doo-wop" by the group and Bivins, who presented Boyz II Men and adolescent R&B group Another Bad Creation to the public as BBD's protégés.

From the beginning, Boyz II Men featured all four members as leads, avoiding the usual R&B group arrangement of one or two lead singers and a team of background singers. The multiple-lead arrangement became a Boyz II Men trademark, and it became typical to hear Wanyá Morris' vibrato-heavy tenor, Shawn Stockman's tenor voice, Nathan Morris' baritone, and Michael McCary's bass (often used in spoken-word sections of many Boyz II Men hits) trading bars in each song.

The album's liner notes identified unique nicknames for each member of the group. These nicknames were devised in collaboration with Bivins in an attempt at marketing. Wanyá was "Squirt", Shawn was "Slim", Michael was simply "Bass", and Nathan assumed the name "Alex Vanderpool", after a soap opera character who brandished a nerdy style.

Boyz II Men's first single, the Dallas Austin-produced "Motownphilly" featured a rap cameo by Michael Bivins that gives the story of how he met Boyz II Men. The single's release was accompanied with a music video that presented the group in hip hop style. (The video also included cameos from fellow Philadelphia High School for Creative and Performing Arts alumni Black Thought and Questlove of The Roots.) Cooleyhighharmonys second single was an a cappella cover of a classic Motown tune, G.C. Cameron's "It's So Hard to Say Goodbye to Yesterday" from the 1975 film Cooley High, while "Uhh Ahh" served as the third single.

Cooleyhighharmony achieved major success, eventually selling over nine million copies and winning the Grammy Award for Best R&B Performance by a Duo or Group with Vocals at the 1992 Grammy Awards. Boyz II Men were also nominated for Best New Artist, along with British singer-songwriter Seal, fellow R&B group Color Me Badd, as well as dance group C+C Music Factory, but the Grammy was awarded to singer-songwriter Marc Cohn. "Motownphilly" and "It's So Hard to Say Goodbye to Yesterday" were number 1 R&B hits and top five U.S. pop hits.

In 1992, Boyz II Men joined MC Hammer's high-profile 2 Legit 2 Quit Tour as an opening act. While traveling the country, their tour manager Khalil Rountree was murdered in Chicago, and the group's future performances of "It's So Hard to Say Goodbye to Yesterday" were dedicated to him. As a result of this unfortunate experience, the song helped advance their success.

While touring during 1992, Boyz II Men returned briefly to the studio to record the single "End of the Road", co-written and produced by Kenneth "Babyface" Edmonds, for the soundtrack to Eddie Murphy's film Boomerang. This song, released as a single on June 30, 1992, became Boyz II Men's biggest hit. It reached the number one position on the Billboard Hot 100 on August 15, remaining there for a record-setting 13 weeks, until November 14, 1992. The success of "End of the Road" instantly transformed Boyz II Men from up-and-coming R&B stars into mainstream music celebrities.

A revamped Cooleyhighharmony was reissued during 1993, with "End of the Road" added as a special bonus track, but "End of the Road" initially appeared only on the Boomerang soundtrack. Later, the track was included on a collection of singles produced by Michael Bivins called "East Coast Family, Vol. 1". Shortly after the release of this compilation, Boyz II Men and Michael Bivins parted ways professionally. Boyz II Men continued to work with Babyface and other high-profile record producers over the next several years.

1994–1996: II and "I'll Make Love to You" 

After releasing a Christmas compilation, Christmas Interpretations in 1993, Boyz II Men returned to the studio for their highly anticipated sophomore effort. In 1994, II was released. II sold more than  copies in the United States alone, becoming one of the best-selling albums ever released by an R&B group act, and one of the biggest albums of the decade. II later won two awards at the 1995 Grammy Awards, including Best R&B Album.

Most of the tracks on II were written and produced by Tim & Bob—Tim Kelley and Bob Robinson (5), Babyface (2) and the successful team of Jimmy Jam and Terry Lewis (2). Several of IIs tracks became major singles, among them Jam & Lewis's "On Bended Knee", and Babyface's "I'll Make Love to You" and "Water Runs Dry".

"I'll Make Love to You" broke "End of the Road's" 13-week record at number 1, by spending 14 weeks at the top of the chart (a feat equaled earlier that year by Whitney Houston's cover of "I Will Always Love You"). "On Bended Knee" replaced "I'll Make Love to You" at number 1, making Boyz II Men only the third act ever to replace itself at number 1 on the Billboard Hot 100 chart, after Elvis Presley and the Beatles.

In 1995, the group appeared as backing vocalists on "HIStory" from Michael Jackson's Grammy-nominated ninth album of the same name.

In 1995, Motown issued The Remix Collection, a compilation of remixes of various Boyz II Men songs from Cooleyhighharmony and II. The group itself had opposed the release of the collection because they felt the compilation did not represent Boyz II Men's best work. After the label released the album without their permission, there was a dispute between the company and the group. Boyz II Men initiated their own recording company Stonecreek (which released material by artists such as Uncle Sam), and they arranged for Stonecreek's distribution by Epic Records, not Motown.

1997–1998: Evolution and label conflicts 
Boyz II Men's third studio album, Evolution, was released during 1997 to mixed reviews and sold three million copies, far below the stratospheric success of IIs ( copies) and Cooleyhighharmony. Only one of Evolutions singles, the Jam/Lewis-penned "Four Seasons of Loneliness", reached number 1 on the Hot 100 chart. The second single, the Babyface-helmed "A Song for Mama" (the theme song to the Babyface-produced film Soul Food,) was a Top 10 success, but the follow-up "Can't Let Her Go" underperformed.

The global tour began in 1997 to promote Evolution was successful in terms of ticket sales, but behind the scenes, Boyz II Men was wracked by conflicts, with their record label and internal conflicts among the members of the group. Making matters worse, health problems began to take their toll on the group. While on tour to support the Evolution album, Wanyá Morris developed a polyp on his vocal cords, and the group was forced to postpone part of the tour until he recovered. McCary's multiple sclerosis meant that he was unable to participate in most of the group's dance routines.

Boyz II Men were nominated for 2 Grammys in 1998: Best R&B Album for Evolution and Best R&B Vocal Performance by a Duo or Group for "A Song for Mama".

1999–2001: Nathan Michael Shawn Wanya 
In 1999, Motown's parent company, PolyGram, was bought by Universal Music Group. Amidst the major corporate restructure, Motown was merged with UMG's Universal Records, where Boyz II Men found themselves reassigned.

Their only studio LP album for Universal, 2000's Nathan Michael Shawn Wanya, was chiefly written and produced by the group itself, in an attempt to update their sound and ward off critics who questioned the group's reliance on Babyface's hit-making songcraft. While the critics were more receptive to Nathan Michael Shawn Wanya than they had been to its predecessor, the LP sold only 500,000 copies in the US,  copies worldwide, and although its two singles, "Pass You By" and "Thank You in Advance," received media attention, neither became hits.

Boyz II Men departed from Universal in 2001, ending their relationship with the company that brought them to international stardom in 1991. The label released a very successful greatest hits compilation, Legacy: The Greatest Hits Collection, to close out their contract.

2002–2003: Full Circle and "The Color of Love" 
Signing a new deal with Arista Records in 2002, Boyz II Men began recording the Full Circle album, and recruited Babyface for a new single, "The Color of Love". In an attempt to recapture the massive success the group had enjoyed a decade earlier, the album received a significant promotional budget. Arista commissioned a high-budget music video, shot in four different locales by four different directors: supervising director Little X filmed scenes featuring Michael McCary in India, Hype Williams filmed Shawn Stockman in Tokyo, Benny Boom filmed Nathan Morris in Ghana, and Chris Robinson filmed Wanyá Morris in Puerto Rico and finally all were filmed in New York. The resulting music video had a debut on BET, but failed to have a great effect, and Full Circle, like Nathan Michael Shawn Wanya before it, sold slightly more than 500,000 copies in the US and  copies worldwide.

Full Circle became Boyz II Men's final album as a quartet, and their last effort to receive extensive promotion from a major record company. On , 2003, Michael McCary left Boyz II Men due to chronic back problems resulting from multiple sclerosis (MS) and personal problems.

2004–2006: Throwback, Vol. 1 and The Remedy 

After a year out of the spotlight, Boyz II Men created the independent label MSM Music Group (distributed through Koch Records), and released the Throwback, Vol. 1 LP in 2004. The album is a collection of covers of classic R&B and soul songs such as The Dazz Band's "Let It Whip", Michael Jackson's "Human Nature", and, as the single, Bobby Caldwell's "What You Won't Do for Love". For this record, Nathan took on the bass lines as well as the baritone vocals that he sang when Boyz II Men was a quartet. Throwback, Vol. 1 reached number 59 on the Billboard 200. The group launched an independent tour of North America and Asia in support of the Throwback series. The album sold over 200,000 copies with little to no promotion aside from the group's independent tour.

In 2005 Boyz II Men recorded a CD with Anderson Cameau called "Apocalypse", a project meant to benefit Haiti.

In 2006, Boyz II Men's seventh studio album, The Remedy, was released exclusively in Japan, where they found a thriving fan base.

2007–2009: Hitsville USA & Love 

In mid-2007, the group re-signed with Universal Records and released the LP Motown: A Journey Through Hitsville USA through the Decca Records label. The LP is a cover album featuring songs from the Motown Records catalog, co-produced by Randy Jackson of American Idol fame. The Motown album includes covers of songs by The Temptations ("Just My Imagination (Running Away with Me)"), Marvin Gaye ("Ain't Nothing Like the Real Thing", "Mercy Mercy Me"), Smokey Robinson & the Miracles ("The Tracks of My Tears"), and even Boyz II Men themselves (an a cappella version of "End of the Road").

Commercially, Motown found some success. It peaked at number 6 on the US R&B chart and was certified Gold in the UK. The album was also a critical success. For the 51st Annual Grammy Awards in 2009, Boyz II Men received two nominations for the album Motown: A Journey Through Hitsville USA (Best R&B Album and Best R&B Performance by a Duo or Group with Vocals for "Ribbon in the Sky").

In 2008, Boyz II Men's three members appeared on Celebrity Don't Forget the Lyrics and created a sensation with their performance. They earned $500,000 for their two nominated charities; the appearance also generated interest in their next release.

In 2009, Boyz II Men announced plans for a new cover album that covers "artists I don't think people would expect us to cover!" according to Shawn Stockman. The album contains remakes of love songs from outside the R&B genre.

2010–2012: Love Cruise and Twenty 

Boyz II Men headlined a "Love Cruise" in honor of their 20th anniversary and in observance of Valentine's Day. The cruise took place –14, 2011, and traveled from Miami, Florida, to Nassau, Bahamas. Cruise passengers received a Boyz II Men welcome cocktail party, a concert performance by Boyz II Men, an additional fan appreciation concert by Boyz II Men, a photo session with Boyz II Men (in small groups), a formal prom night, a poker tournament, a deck party with Boyz II Men and a guest DJ, a singles mixer, a gift bag, and onboard drawings for other Boyz II Men events. Couples were able to renew their wedding vows in a special ceremony with Boyz II Men.

Twenty, named in recognition of Boyz II Men's twenty years in the music business, is a double CD album with thirteen original songs and eight rerecorded Boyz II Men classics. It was released on October 25, 2011. Twenty is the group's fourth release through MSM Music Group. It was released in Japan 13 days before its official US release date with the help of Avex Group, the biggest Japanese independent record label.

Originally, Boyz II Men announced a reunion with original member Michael McCary for the Twenty album. On September 6, 2009, at a concert in Virginia Beach, Virginia, Stockman announced that their upcoming 20th anniversary album would "include all 4 members", sparking a tremendous applause.
But soon after that announcement, McCary declined and did not join the project.

As a trio, Boyz II Men performed as special guests on VH1's highly rated VH1 Divas Celebrate Soul concert.

Boyz II Men contributed a cover of Japanese rock band L'Arc~en~Ciel's song "Snow Drop" to their 2012 tribute album.

2013–present: The Package Tour, Collide and Geico commercials 

On January 22, 2013, the group appeared on The View along with New Kids on the Block and 98 Degrees to announce their joint tour that took place in summer 2013. As of February 20, 2013, Boyz II Men announced that beginning March 1, 2013, they will stop touring and begin performing shows at the Mirage Hotel and Casino in Las Vegas.

On January 13, 2014, the trio appeared at the end of an episode of How I Met Your Mother titled "Slapsgiving 3: Slappointment in Slapmarra", performing an a cappella version of the show's song "You Just Got Slapped". Their eleventh album, titled Collide, was released on October 21, 2014.

In 2016, the trio appeared in Grease: Live as the Teen Angels and sang Beauty School Dropout.
Wanyá placed 4th for the 22nd season of the ABC reality competition series Dancing With The Stars. They also did music for an animated adaptation of The Snowy Day.

In 2017, the group began starring in television commercials for GEICO Auto Insurance.

On June 24, 2017, a section of Broad Street in Philadelphia, from Christian to Carpenter Streets, was renamed “Boyz II Men Boulevard” by the city council. Philadelphia High School for the Creative and Performing Arts, where the members of Boyz II Men were once students, is on this section of Broad Street.

In August 2017, it was announced they were releasing a new album titled Under the Streetlight in the Fall. It was released on October 20, 2017.

On January 4, 2018, the group was featured in a new track released by Charlie Puth, titled "If You Leave Me Now", created for Charlie Puth's album Voicenotes.

On September 6, 2018, the group performed at the NFL 2018–2019 season kickoff at Lincoln Financial Field in Philadelphia, PA.

On October 2, 2018, the group performed "Ladies Man" on ABC's Dancing with the Stars. DeMarcus Ware and Lindsay Arnold danced a quickstep to the song.

The group is featured on a re-imagined version of Take That's song Love Ain't Here Anymore from their number one selling album Odyssey. Howard Donald revealed during an interview with Magic Radio that "he fulfilled a dream when they recorded this song".

On December 15, 2018, the group staged a concert at the Smart Araneta Coliseum with Filipino girl group DIVAS—a group composed of Kyla, Yeng Constantino, KZ Tandingan and Angeline Quinto titled Boyz II Men with DIVAS.

On September 18, 2019, it was reported that the group would play themselves on the ABC comedy series Schooled.

On September 30, 2019, Boyz II Men announced their Asia Tour, which is slated to take place after returning from their US tour and residency in Las Vegas. They will be visiting cities such as Kuala Lumpur, Bangkok (December 7), Singapore (December 9) and Manila.

On December 31, 2022, Boyz II Men performed the National Anthem at the Fiesta Bowl before the Michigan Wolverines and the TCU Horned Frogs faced off in the College Football Playoff semifinals.

Style and influence 
Boyz II Men is among the biggest names in a cappella and R&B. With what was called "crossover appeal", Boyz II Men found themselves at the vanguard of the 1990s movement to take R&B back into the mainstream, where it had been back in the 1970s. Their use of hip-hop beats in combination with R&B was not unique, but it was Boyz II Men's enormous success with mainstream audiences in "putting harmony over the hip-hop tracks" that helped usher in the near-total dominance of the R&B genre on the pop charts in the 2000s and 2010s. On January 5, 2012, Boyz II Men were awarded a star on the Hollywood Walk of Fame. They were featured on the first episode of the 2021 Netflix series This Is Pop, called "The Boyz II Men Effect", about their impact on the boy band scene in the 1990s.

Members 
Current
 Nathan Morris (1985–present)
 Wanyá Morris (1987–present)
 Shawn Stockman (1988–present)

Former
 Michael McCary (1988–2003)
 Marc Nelson (1985–1990)
 George Baldi (1985–1988)
 Jon Shoats (1985–1988)
 Marguerite Walker (1985–1988)

Timeline

Discography 

 Studio albums
 Cooleyhighharmony (1991)
 Christmas Interpretations (1993)
 II (1994)
 Evolution (1997)
 Nathan Michael Shawn Wanya (2000)
 Full Circle (2002)
 Throwback, Vol. 1 (2004)
 The Remedy (2006)
 Motown: A Journey Through Hitsville USA (2007)
 Love (2009)
 Twenty (2011)
 Collide (2014)
 Under the Streetlight (2017)

Filmography 
 "Going Home" (1995): A Disney Channel concert special filmed during Boyz II Men's "All Around the World Tour" live from the Alamodome in San Antonio, Texas.
 The group makes a guest appearance in fourth season episode "Twas the Night Before Christening" of The Fresh Prince of Bel-Air in which they sing at Nicky's christening (1993).
 "Living In Paradise?" (2000): They appeared as themselves on the hit show Moesha.
 "How I Met Your Mother" (2014): They appeared as themselves in an episode to perform "You Just Got Slapped"
 Long Shot: They appear as themselves performing at a charity event.
 This Is Pop (2021): They are featured on the episode "The Boyz II Men Effect".
 Celebrity Wheel of Fortune (2021): Wanyá and Shawn play to win money for charities of their choice.
 A Very Boyband Christmas (2021): Wanyá and Shawn join members of 'Nsync, 98 Degrees and other boy bands to celebrate the holidays.
 Live in Front of a Studio Audience (2021): The group performs the theme song of Diff'rent Strokes as the intro to the special’s reenactment of "Willis’s Privacy".

Awards and nominations 
American Music Awards

|-
!scope="row" rowspan="5" | 1992
!scope="row" rowspan="3" |Boyz II Men
|Favorite Soul/R&B New Artist
|
|-
|Favorite Pop/Rock New Artist
|
|-
|Favorite Soul/R&B Band/Duo/Group
|
|-
|"Motownphilly"
|Favorite Soul/R&B Single
|
|-
|Cooleyhighharmony
|Favorite Soul/R&B Album
|
|-
!scope="row" rowspan="2" | 1993
|"End of the Road"
|Favorite Pop/Rock Song
|
|-
!scope="row" rowspan="3"|Boyz II Men
!scope="row" rowspan="2"|Favorite Soul/R&B Band/Duo/Group
|
|-
!scope="row" rowspan="4" | 1995
|
|-
|Favorite Adult Contemporary Artist
|
|-
!scope="row" rowspan="2"|"I'll Make Love to You"
|Favorite Soul/R&B Single
|
|-
|Favorite Pop/Rock Song
|
|-
!scope="row" rowspan="5" | 1996
!scope="row" rowspan="2"|II
|Favorite Soul/R&B Album
|
|-
|Favorite Pop/Rock Album
|
|-
!scope="row" rowspan="4"|Boyz II Men
|Artist of the Year
|
|-
|Favorite Pop/Rock Band/Duo/Group
|
|-
!scope="row" rowspan="2"|Favorite Soul/R&B Band/Duo/Group
|
|-
| 1998
| 
|-

Billboard Music Awards

|-
!scope="row" rowspan="2" | 1992
|Boyz II Men
|Top Hot 100 Artist
|
|-
|"End of the Road"
!scope="row" rowspan="2" | Top Hot 100 Song
|
|-
| 1994
|"I'll Make Love to You"
|
|-
!scope="row" rowspan="3" |  1995
|II
|Top Billboard 200 Album
|
|-
!scope="row" rowspan="2" | Boyz II Men
|Top Artist
|
|-
|Top R&B Artist
|
|-
!scope="row" rowspan="2" | 1996
!scope="row" rowspan="2" | "One Sweet Day" (with Mariah Carey)
|Top Hot 100 Song
|
|-
|Billboard Music Special Hot 100
|
|-

Grammy Awards

|-
!scope="row" rowspan="2" | 1992
|Boyz II Men
|Best New Artist
|
|-
|Cooleyhighharmony
!scope="row" rowspan="4"|Best R&B Performance by a Duo or Group with Vocal
|
|-
| 1993
|"End of the Road"
|
|-
| 1994
|"Let It Snow"
|
|-
!scope="row" rowspan="3" | 1995
|!scope="row" rowspan="2"|"I'll Make Love To You"
|
|-
|Record of the Year
|
|-
|II
|Best R&B Album
|
|-
!scope="row" rowspan="2" | 1996
|!scope="row" rowspan="2"|"One Sweet Day" (with Mariah Carey)
|Record of the Year
|
|-
|Best Pop Collaboration with Vocals
|
|-
!scope="row" rowspan="2" | 1998
|"A Song For Mama"
|Best R&B Performance by a Duo or Group with Vocal
|
|-
|Evolution
!scope="row" rowspan="2"|Best R&B Album
|
|-
!scope="row" rowspan="2" | 2001
|Nathan Michael Shawn Wanya
|
|-
|"Pass You By"
!scope="row" rowspan="2"|Best R&B Performance By a Duo or Group with Vocal
|
|-
!scope="row" rowspan="2" | 2009
|"Ribbon In The Sky"
|
|-
|Motown: A Journey Through Hitsville USA
|Best R&B Album
|
|-

MTV Video Music Awards

!Ref.
|-
| 1993
| "End of the Road"
| rowspan=2|Best R&B Video
| 
| rowspan=4|
|-
| rowspan=2|1995
| rowspan=2|"Water Runs Dry"
| 
|-
| Best Cinematography
| 
|-
| 1996
| "One Sweet Day" (with Mariah Carey)
| Best R&B Video
| 

Soul Train Music Awards

|-
|1992
|Boyz II Men
|Best New R&B/Soul Artist
|
|-
!scope="row" rowspan="3"|1993
!scope="row" rowspan="2"|"End of the Road"
|Song of the Year
|
|-
|Best R&B Music Video
|
|-
|"Please Don't Go"
|Best R&B Single – Group, Band or Duo
|
|-
!scope="row" rowspan="2"|1995
|II
|R&B/Soul Album Group, Band or Duo
|
|-
|"I'll Make Love to You"
|R&B/Soul Single Group, Band or Duo
|
|-
|1996
|Boyz II Men
|Entertainer of the Year
|
|-
|1998
|Evolution
!scope="row" rowspan="2"|Best R&B/Soul Album – Group, Band or Duo
|
|-
|2003
|Full Circle
|
|-

See also 
 List of best-selling music artists
 List of artists who reached number one in the United States

References

External links 

 
African-American musical groups
American contemporary R&B musical groups
American vocal groups
Ballad music groups
American boy bands
Grammy Award winners
Motown artists
Musical groups established in 1988
Musical groups from Philadelphia
Sony Music Publishing artists
Vocal quartets
Vocal trios
Avex Group artists
1988 establishments in Pennsylvania